Alberta has provincial legislation allowing its municipalities to conduct municipal censuses between April 1 and June 30 inclusive. Municipalities choose to conduct their own censuses for multiple reasons such as to better inform municipal service planning and provision, to capitalize on per capita based grant funding from higher levels of government, or to simply update their populations since the last federal census.

Alberta had 357 municipalities between April 1 and June 30, 2015, which marked the closure of the 2015 legislated municipal census period. This was reduced to 356 on July 1, 2015 when the former Village of Minburn dissolved to become a hamlet under the jurisdiction of the County of Minburn No. 27. At least 52 of these municipalities conducted a municipal census in 2015. Alberta Municipal Affairs recognized those conducted by 50 of these municipalities. By municipal status, it recognized those conducted by 12 of Alberta's 18 cities, 20 of 108 towns, 5 of 92 villages, 3 of 5 specialized municipalities, 2 of 64 municipal districts, and all 8 Metis settlements. In addition to those recognized by Municipal Affairs, censuses were conducted by the villages of Kitscoty and Warburg.

Some municipalities achieved population milestones as a result of their 2015 censuses. Red Deer became the third city in Alberta to exceed 100,000 residents, while Grande Prairie not only surpassed 60,000 people, but also overtook both St. Albert and Medicine Hat to become Alberta's fifth-largest city. Spruce Grove grew beyond the 30,000 mark, while both the Town of Blackfalds and the County of Vermilion River eclipsed 8,000. The Town of Westlock's population resurfaced above 5,000 after first doing so in 2006 but dropping back below in 2008. The Village of Thorsby surpassed 1,000, making it eligible to apply for town status.

Municipal census results 
The following summarizes the results of the numerous municipal censuses conducted in 2015.

Breakdowns

Lloydminster 
The following is a breakdown of the results of the City of Lloydminster's 2015 municipal census by provincial component.

Urban and rural service areas

Strathcona County

Wood Buffalo

Hamlets 
The following is a list of hamlet populations determined by 2015 municipal censuses conducted by the County of Vermilion River, Strathcona County and the Regional Municipality (RM) of Wood Buffalo excluding the urban service areas of Fort McMurray and Sherwood Park that are presented above.

Shadow population counts 
Alberta Municipal Affairs defines shadow population as "temporary residents of a municipality who are employed by an industrial or commercial establishment in the municipality for a minimum of 30 days within a municipal census year." The RM of Wood Buffalo conducted a shadow population count in 2015. The following presents the results of this count for comparison with its concurrent municipal census results.

Notes

See also 
2013 Alberta municipal elections
Canada 2016 Census
List of communities in Alberta

References

External links 
Alberta Municipal Affairs: Municipal Census & Population Lists
Statistics Canada: Census Profile (2011 Census)

Local government in Alberta
Municipal censuses in Alberta
2015 censuses
2015 in Alberta